Narakot is a village development committee in Jumla District in the Karnali Zone of north-western Nepal. At the time of the 1991 Nepal census it had a population of 2752 persons living in 494 individual households.

References

External links
UN map of the municipalities of Jumla District

Populated places in Jumla District